Marco Filibeck (born May 11, 1957) is an Italian lighting designer.

Biography
His father was the painter Gilberto Filibeck. Marco starts his career as lighting consolle operator, working on over two hundred live concert for Vasco Rossi between 1979 and 1984. He collaborates with different artists from the Italian music scene, like Enzo Jannacci ("Ci vuole orecchio" tour, 1981) and Loredana Bertè ("E la luna bussò" tour, 1979).

In 1983, Filibeck gets a qualification as light technician at Bologna's Teatro Comunale. Two years later he's hired at Teatro alla Scala in Milan. From 1996 Marco Filibeck is lighting designer at Teatro alla Scala and in 2009 he becomes the lighting manager. During his career Filibeck has worked with the most important Italian and foreign directors, such as Franco Zeffirelli, Luca Ronconi, Liliana Cavani, Gabriele Salvatores, Àlex Ollé (La Fura dels Baus).

Marco Filibeck designed, starting from 2008, the lights for Roberto Bolle & Friends ballet, a recurring production hosted in the major Italian archeological sites and squares, like Colosseum in Rome, Valle dei Templi in Agrigento, piazza del Duomo in Milan, Arena di Verona and Piazza San Marco in Venice.

In 2018 he received the Franco Abbiati award for the light of the opera Hänsel und Gretel (directed by Sven-Eric Bechtolf).

Teacher
From 1999 he's professor of lighting for the "Light Designer", "Scenography" and "Direction" programs at Accademia Teatro alla Scala. In the past, Filibeck was a guest teacher at Brera Academy and Polytechnic University of Milan for the "Lighting Designer" Master program. In 2016-2017 he taught at Accademia Linguistica di Belle Arti in Genoa.

Works

Opera

Teatro alla Scala 
2009

Il viaggio a Reims, by Luca Ronconi and Gae Aulenti
Le convenienze e inconvenienze teatrali, by Antonio Albanese and Leila Fteita

2010

L'occasione fa il ladro, by Jean Pierre Ponnelle
Faust, by Eimuntas and Marius Nekrosius
Simon Boccanegra, by Federico Tiezzi

2011

La donna del lago, by Luis Pasqual and Ezio Frigerio
Der Rosenkavalier, by Herbert Wernicke
Attila, by Gabriele Lavia and Alessandro Camera
Quartett, by Àlex Ollé - La Fura dels Baus

2012

La bohème, by Franco Zeffirelli

2013

Aida, by Franco Zeffirelli and Maurizio Millenotti
Lo spazzacamino, di Lorenza Cantini e Angelo Sala
Oberto, Conte di San Bonifacio, by Mario Martone and Sergio Tramonti

2014

Il trovatore, by Hugo de Ana
Così fan tutte, by Claus Guth

2015

Wozzeck, by Jürgen Flimm

2016

Rigoletto, by Gilbert Deflò and Ezio Frigerio

2017

La gazza ladra, by Gabriele Salvatores
La traviata, by Liliana Cavani, Dante Ferretti and Gabriella Pescucci
Der Freischütz, by Matthias Hartmann and Raimund Voigt
Hänsel und Gretel, by Sven-Eric Bechtolf and Julian Crouch
Die Entführung aus dem Serail, GiorgioStrehler and Ezio Frigerio

2018

Ernani, by Sven-Eric Bechtolf and Julian Crouch
Alì Babà e i 40 ladroni, by Liliana Cavani and Leila Fteita

2019

La cenerentola, by Jean-Pierre Ponnelle
Ariadne auf Naxos, by Frederic Wake-Walker
Prima la musica poi le parole, by Grischa Asagaroff and Luigi Perego
2020
A riveder le stelle... , by Davide Livermore , Giò Forma, D-Wok
2021

 Così fan tutte, directed by Michael Hampe, Mauro Pagano
L'italiana in Algeri , by Jean Pierre Ponnelle 
Le nozze di Figaro, by Giorgio Strehler and Ezio Frigerio
2022

 Capuleti e Montecchi, by Adrian Noble e Tobias Hoheisel and  Lights by Jean Kalman e Marco Filibeck
 Un ballo in maschera by Marco Arturo Marelli

Other opera productions 
1998

Carillon, by Giorgio Marini and Lauro Crisman (Teatro Strehler, Milan)
Il re pastore, by Mietta Corli (Teatro Giovanni da Udine, Udine)
Il furioso all'isola di San Domingo, by Micha Van Hoecke and Gheorghe Iancu (Teatro Donizetti, Bergamo; Teatro Strehler, Milan)

1999

Madama Butterfly, by Mietta Corli (Cortile della Pilotta, Parma; Castello Sforzesco, Milano; Teatro Sào Carlos, Lisbon)

2000

Otello, by Mietta Corli (Villa Pallavicino, Busseto)
La traviata, by Mietta Corli (Villa Pallavicino, Busseto)
La bohème, by Mietta Corli and Marina Bianchi (Teatro San Carlo, Naples)

2001

Il trovatore, by Mietta Corli (Castello di Vigoleno, Piacenza)

2002

Oberto, Conte di San Bonifacio, by Pier'Alli (Teatro degli Arcimboldi, Milan)
Tosca, by Mietta Corli (Castello di Vigoleno, Piacenza)
Le nozze di Figaro, by Mietta Corli (Teatro Coliseu, Porto)

2003

Passage, by Micha Van Hoecke and Luciana Savignano (Teatro Strehler, Milan)
Ugo, Conte di Parigi, by Guido de Monticelli and Angelo Sala (Teatro Donizetti, Bergamo; Teatro degli Arcimboldi, Milan; Teatro Bellini, Catania)
Carmina Burana, by Mietta Corli (Teatro Coliseu, Porto; Castello di Vigoleno, Piacenza)
Vita, by Giorgio Gallione (Teatro Studio, Milan)

2004

L'arlesiana, by Mietta Corli (Teatro Rendano, Cosenza)
La traviata, by Marco Gandini and Italo Grassi (Teatro Grande, Brescia; Teatro Carlo Felice, Genoa)
Cavalleria rusticana - La vida breve, by Marco Gandini and Italo Grassi (Teatro Carlo Goldoni, Livorno)

2005

L'italiana in Algeri, by Marco Gandini and Lucia Goj (Teatro Comunale, Treviso)
Il flauto magico, by Mietta Corli (Teatro Coliseu, Porto)
Carmen, by Amedeo Amodio and Luisa Spinatelli (Teatro degli Arcimboldi, Milan)
La finta semplice, by Marco Gandini (Teatro Malibran, Venice)

2006

Pagliacci, by Marco Gandini and Italo Grassi (Teatro Verdi, Sassari)
Così fan tutte, by Marco Gandini and Italo Grassi (Teatro Municipale, Piacenza)
Il flauto magico, by Marco Gandini and Lucia Goj (Teatro Olimpico, Vicenza)

2007

Un ballo in maschera, by Marco Gandini and Italo Grassi (Teatro del Maggio musicale, Florence)
Il pirata, by Pier'Alli (Teatro delle Muse, Ancona)

2008

Aida '62, by Franco Zeffirelli (Teatro Massimo, Palermo)

2009

Il mondo alla rovescia, by Marco Gandini and Carlo Centolavigna (Teatro Salieri, Legnago; Teatro Filarmonico, Verona)
La bohème, by Franco Zeffirelli and Piero Tosi (New Israeli Opera, Tel Aviv)

2010

Madama Butterfly, by Damiano Michieletto (Teatro Regio, Turin)
Betulia liberata, by Marco Gandini and Italo Grassi (Haus fur Mozart, Salisburgo; Teatro Dante Alighieri, Ravenna)

2011

Simon Boccanegra, by Marco Gandini and Italo Grassi (KNO, Seoul)

2012

Il viaggio a Reims, by Marco Gandini and Italo Grassi (Teatro del Maggio musicale, Florence)

2013

Fidelio, by Gary Hill (Opéra Lyon, Lyon)
Il barbiere di Siviglia, by Leo Iizuka and Italo Grassi (Art Performing Center, Kobe)
Il prigioniero - Erwartung, by Àlex Ollé and Alfons Flores - La Fura dels Baus (Opéra Lyon, Lyon)

2015

I puritani, by Fabio Ceresa and Tiziano Santi (Teatro del Maggio musicale, Florence)
Pelleas et Melisande by Alex Ollè ( La fura dels baus) and  Alfons Flores (Semperoper Dresden)

2016

Madama Butterfly, by Àlex Ollé - La Fura dels Baus (Terme di Caracalla, Rome)
Norma, by Àlex Ollé and Alfons Flores - La Fura dels Baus (Royal Opera House, London)
Le cid, by Guy Joosten and Alfons Flores - La Fura dels Baus (Festspiele, St. Gallen)

2017

Alceste, by Àlex Ollé andAlfons Flores (Opéra Lyon, Lyon)
Il ratto del serraglio, di Giorgio Strehler (Teatro San Carlo, Naples)
Madama Butterfly, by Keita Asari (New Israeli Opera, Tel Aviv)

2019

Turandot, by Franc Aleu and Carles Berga - La Fura dels Baus (Teatro Gran Liceu, Barcelona)
2021

 Carmen, by Alex Ollè (La fura dels baus) and Alfons Flores (New National Theatre, Tokyo)
2022

 La Boheme by Dante Ferretti (Art Performing Center Kobe, Japan)

Ballet

Teatro alla Scala 
2000

Ondine, by Frederick Ashton

2005

La sylphide, by Pier Lacotte and Aureliè Dupont

2006

Vanitas, by Fabrizio Monteverde

2010

Romeo e Giulietta, by Kenneth MacMillan and Mauro Carosi

2011

Raymonda, by Marius Petipa
L'altro Casanova, by Gianluca Schiavoni and Aurelio Colombo

2012

L'altra metà del cielo, by Martha Clarke and Vasco Rossi

2014

Don Chisciotte, by Rudolf Nureyev and Raffaele del Savio

2015

Excelsior, by Ugo Dell'Ara and Filippo Crivelli

2016

Il giardino degli amanti, by Roberto Bolle, Massimiliano Volpini and Erika Carretta

2018

Lo schiaccianoci, by George Balanchine and Margherita Palli
Le Corsaire, by Anna-Marie Holmes e Maria Luisa Spinatelli
Bolero, di Maurice Bèjart
2022

 La Bayadere, di Rudolf Nureyev e Maria Luisa Spinatelli

Other ballet productions 
2007

Il mare in catene, by Francesco Ventriglia (Biennale danza, Venice; Teatro Strehler, Milan)

2008

Roberto Bolle & Friends (Colosseum, Rome; Piazza del Plebiscito, Naples; Piazza del Duomo, Milan; Valle dei Templi, Agrigento, Piazza San Marco, Venice)

2010

Don Chisciotte, by Vladimir Derevianko and Roberta Guidi di Bagno (Teatro del Maggio musicale, Florence)

2011

Lo schiaccianoci, by Aaron Watkin and Roberta Guidi di Bagno (Semperoper, Dresden)
Coppélia, by George Balanchine and Roberta Guidi di Bagno (Semperoper, Dresden)

2016

Don Chisciotte, by Aaron Witkins and Patrick Kinmonth (Semperoper, Dresden)

2018

Don Chisciotte, by Victor Ullate and Roberta Guidi di Bagno (Staatsballet, Berlin)

Musical 
2014

La famiglia Addams, by Giorgio Gallione, Guido Fiorato and Stefano Benni (Teatro della Luna, Milan)

Fashion 
2012 - 2019

Haute couture shows for Dolce & Gabbana (Taormina; Ansaldo Laboratories, Teatro alla Scala, Palazzo Litta, Pinacoteca Ambrosiana, Milan)

Awards

 2018 - Premio Franco Abbiati - Hänsel und Gretel, directed by Sven-Eric Bechtolf

See also

Teatro alla Scala
La Fura dels Baus

Notes and references

External links
 Official website

1957 births
Living people
Lighting designers